Rebasmäe  is a village in Võru Parish, Võru County in southeastern Estonia.

On the territory of Rebasmäe there are Ilumetsa impact craters. Two biggest of them are known as Põrguhaud ja Sügavhaud.

There is also a Rebasmäe Spring.

References

 

Võru Parish
Villages in Võru County